David Perez (born 26 June 1990) is a Swedish politician. He is currently a Sweden Democratic member of the Swedish Riksdag for Uppsala.

References 

Living people
1990 births
Place of birth missing (living people)
Members of the Riksdag from the Sweden Democrats
Members of the Riksdag 2018–2022
People from Uppsala
Members of the Riksdag 2022–2026
21st-century Swedish politicians